The YWCA Boston building is a historic building located at 140 Clarendon Street in the Back Bay neighborhood of Boston, Massachusetts. The 13-story brick-faced steel-frame building was designed by George F. Shepard and Frederic Stearns, and built in 1929. The building once housed an indoor swimming pool and recreation facilities for the YWCA Boston; it is now operated by Clarendon Residences LLC, which provides affordable and market-rate housing, the boutique hotel Hotel 140, facilities for the Lyric Stage of Boston and Snowden International High School, and corporate offices for several small and mid-sized for-profit and not-for-profit tenants.

The building was listed on the National Register of Historic Places in 2004.

See also 
 National Register of Historic Places listings in northern Boston, Massachusetts

References

External links
YWCA Boston website
Hotel 140 website

Buildings and structures completed in 1929
Clubhouses on the National Register of Historic Places in Massachusetts
Buildings and structures in Boston
Back Bay, Boston
YWCA buildings
Neoclassical architecture in Massachusetts
National Register of Historic Places in Boston
Women in Boston
History of women in Massachusetts